Cuffley is a village in the civil parish of Northaw and Cuffley, in the Welwyn Hatfield district of south-east Hertfordshire located between Cheshunt and Potters Bar. It has a population of just over 4,000 people. and is part of Broxbourne parliamentary constituency.

History

The railway had an important impact on the development of the village. Cuffley was reached by the Great Northern Railway in 1910, as part of the plan to create the Hertford Loop Line, as a strategic alternative to the main line out of King's Cross to the north, by extending the line from Enfield Chase.

The early history of Cuffley is recounted by one of its residents, Molly Hughes, in her autobiographical book A London Family Between the Wars.

On 3 September 1916 the German airship SL 11 was shot down and crashed in Cuffley during an aerial bombardment intended for London. This incident is commemorated by a memorial on East Ridgeway to Lieutenant W. Leefe Robinson, the pilot who shot the airship down; he was awarded the Victoria Cross.
There is also a model of the airship in the village hall. Contrary to many reports of the incident, the SL 11 airship was not a Zeppelin but an army Schütte-Lanz airship. Regardless, the local football team is still nicknamed 'The Zeps' after this event.

In 1939, the Scout Association purchased part of the Tolmers Park Estate that lies within the Parish of Cuffley. Tolmers Scout Camp was opened on Whit Saturday 1940 by Lord Wigram. Today, Tolmers hosts thousands of young people annually from all over the UK and across Europe; not only Scouts and Guides but schools and youth groups as well.

Transport
Cuffley is near to the M25 motorway and is part of the London commuter belt. Cuffley railway station provides a commuter service to Moorgate, Finsbury Park and King's Cross, services operated by Great Northern.

Facilities
Cuffley Primary School has occupied its present building since 1938 when it replaced the original Victorian school room.

Preschool education for children aged 2 to 5 years old is available at the youth centre (Cuffley Community Centre Pre-School).

St Andrew's Anglican Church, built in 1965 on the site of the old school, replaced the 'tin church' built in 1911 next to the old village green. The village also has a Baptist church, which in May 2011 changed its name to the Life Church and is associated with the Life Church at Potters Bar. There is also St Martin de Porres Roman Catholic Church.

Notable residents
Its most notable current resident is Sir Terry Leahy, former CEO of Tesco, although this did not prevent locals from objecting vehemently to plans to build a  "Express" store in the village replacing one of only two remaining village pubs. Other famous residents include Premier League footballers Ledley King, Jermain Defoe, Niko Kranjcar, David Bentley, Kyle Walker and Armand Traoré; and also former Sugababes singer Keisha Buchanan and Myleene Klass.

References

External links
Cuffley Online — Village Website

 
Villages in Hertfordshire
Aviation accidents and incidents locations in England
Welwyn Hatfield